Chloroclystis metallospora is a species of moth of the  family Geometridae. It is found in Australia.

References

Moths described in 1904
Chloroclystis
Moths of Australia